Steckborn District is a former district of the canton of Thurgau, Switzerland. Its capital was the town of Steckborn.

The former district contained the following municipalities:

References

Former districts of Thurgau